Maple Ridge is a city in British Columbia, Canada. It is located in the northeastern section of Greater Vancouver between the Fraser River and the Golden Ears, which is a group of mountain summits which are the southernmost of the Garibaldi Ranges of the Coast Mountains. Maple Ridge's population in 2021 was 90,990. Its downtown core is known as Haney.

History 
Maple Ridge was incorporated as a district municipality on September 12, 1874. It covered an area of  yet was home to only approximately 50 families. Maple Ridge is British Columbia's fifth-oldest municipality (after New Westminster, Victoria, Langley, and Chilliwack). From the creation of British Columbia's regional districts in 1965 until the expansion of Metro Vancouver in 1995, it was part of the now-defunct Dewdney-Alouette Regional District with the City of Pitt Meadows and District of Mission and other north-side communities east to Chehalis. Maple Ridge has been part of Metro Vancouver since 1995.

On March 26, 2014, Maple Ridge residents voted to change the community's status from district municipality to city. Subsequently, Maple Ridge Council submitted its request for status change to the Minister of Community, Sport and Cultural Development. The status change became official on September 12, 2014, which coincided with Maple Ridge's 140th anniversary of municipal incorporation.

Geography

Communities 
Maple Ridge is made up of several different historical areas, including:
Albion
Haney (which is now also the downtown area of Maple Ridge)
Iron Mountain
Kanaka Creek
Port Hammond
Ruskin
Silver Valley
Thornhill
Webster's Corners
Whonnock
Yennadon

Some of these areas are identified with a cultural group. For instance, Albion and Webster's Corners are represented by the many Finnish families that settled in the area. Port Hammond is known for its small cottage-like mill houses originally built by the local mill to house its workers, Ruskin is the location of a community hall of the Sons of Norway, although the area was founded by English followers of John Ruskin, and Kanaka Creek originally was a community for Kanaka employees of Fort Langley.

Port Haney, located adjacent to the Fraser River to the southwest of downtown Haney, and the site of the West Coast Express commuter rail station, is a heritage district created to protect some of the remaining buildings from earlier times. In addition to buildings already on-site when this was the steamboat landing as well as the CPR station, other heritage buildings from around the City of Maple Ridge were relocated to Port Haney to preserve them and enhance the heritage flavour of the location.

Climate

Demographics 

Ethnicity 

Note: Totals greater than 100% due to multiple origin responses.

Religion 
According to the 2021 census, religious groups in Maple Ridge included:
Irreligion (50,135 persons or 55.8%)
Christianity (33,120 persons or 36.9%)
Islam (2,105 persons or 2.3%)
Sikhism (1,925 persons or 2.1%)
Hinduism (890 persons or 1.0%)
Buddhism (520 persons or 0.6%)
Judaism (145 persons or 0.2%)
Indigenous Spirituality (80 persons or 0.1%)
Language

78.5% of residents spoke English as their mother tongue in 2021. The next most common first languages were Chinese languages (2.5%), Punjabi (1.5%), Tagalog (1.5%), Persian (1.5%), Spanish (1.2%), Korean (1.1%), French (1.0%). 2.2% of residents listed both English and a non-official language as mother tongues.

Economy 
Early settlers in Maple Ridge engaged in forestry and agriculture. Forestry companies continue to be the largest private-sector employers in the district. They include Interfor and companies that manufacture building materials, yachts and poles.

Maple Ridge hosted the only North American high-volume manufacturer of lithium-ion batteries, E-One Moli Energy. However, the factory suffered major layoffs due to the 2008 recession and now only hosts a small product testing team.

The city of Maple Ridge has become a popular location for feature films and television series. The Ridge Film Studios is located downtown, in an old retail space, and serves as a set location for episodic television programs. Maple Ridge's film roots go back to the 1970s, when scenes for the feature film Rambo were shot here. Over time the city has been a background for a number of films and television series, including The X-Files, Bordertown, Smallville, Bird on a Wire, We're No Angels, Percy Jackson & the Olympians: The Lightning Thief, and Stargate SG-1. In recent months the old Bordertown set was featured in an episode of the WB series Legends of Tomorrow.

The city is currently working to zone new commercial and industrial lands in order to expand local employment opportunities.

Arts and culture 
Venues for performing arts in Maple Ridge include the Arts Centre and Theatre (ACT), the bandstand in Memorial Peace Park, and various theatres in local secondary schools.

The ACT contains a main stage theatre capable of seating 486 for musical and dramatic performances as well as a studio theatre used for other performances, classes and special events. The ACT is also home to a conference room and smaller classrooms for activities such as pottery and painting. The ACT is a non-profit public resource. The Maple Ridge Art Gallery is also located in the ACT, focusing on local artists and art students.

Maple Ridge also has several festivals and annual parades, including the Santa Claus Parade & Christmas in the Park, Earth Day celebrations in Memorial Peace Park, Canada Day in Memorial Peace Park, GETI Fest in Memorial Peace Park, AdStock Music Festival in Memorial Peace Park, Aboriginal Day celebrations in Memorial Peace Park, The Celebrate the Night Halloween & Fireworks event at Memorial Peace Park, the Caribbean Festival at the Albion Fairgrounds and the one of the longest running agricultural fairs in BC, Country Fest at the fairgrounds.

Maple Ridge offers one of the largest Remembrance Day celebrations in the Lower Mainland each November 11 at Memorial Peace Park. The event is hosted by the Royal Canadian legion Branch No. 88 and boasts annual attendance of over 2,000 local residents for the parade of veterans and first responders and moving Cenotaph ceremony.

The Haney Farmers market runs every Saturday from 9:00 am until 2:00 pm starting in May through to October at Memorial Peace Park

Maple Ridge is the home of the Maple Ridge Concert Band, a community concert band that has been in existence for over 50 years.

Sports 
Maple Ridge is the hometown of several athletes such as baseball players Larry Walker and Tyler O’Neil, deceased race-car driver Greg Moore, professional gamer Isaac Dornbusch, and hockey players Cam Neely, Brendan Morrison, Ryan Butler, Nick McBride, and Andrew Ladd.

Government 
Maple Ridge is governed at the municipal level by a seven-member council made up of six councillors and a mayor. Five of the seven school trustees elected to the School District 42 Maple Ridge-Pitt Meadows Board of Education are chosen by Maple Ridge voters. School trustees, councillors and the mayor are elected on the same ballot for four-year terms. In addition, residents of Maple Ridge vote for representatives to the Legislative Assembly of British Columbia and the House of Commons of Canada.

Dan Ruimy is the current mayor of Maple Ridge. He was first elected mayor on October 15, 2022. Previous mayors include Gordon Robson, Kathy Morse, Al Hogarth, Bill Hartley, Belle Morse, Carl Durkson, Ernie Daykin, Nicole Read, and Mike Morden. The next Municipal Election will be held in the fall of 2026.

Maple Ridge has two constituencies in the Legislative Assembly of British Columbia. In the 2017 BC Provincial Election, the British Columbia New Democratic Party won both of Maple Ridge's seats. NDP MLA Bob D'Eith holds the Maple Ridge-Mission constituency while MLA Lisa Beare represents the Maple Ridge-Pitt Meadows constituency.

Maple Ridge has one constituency in the House of Commons of Canada. In the 2019 federal election and 2021 federal election, the Conservative Party won the seat. The MP is Marc Dalton.

Transportation 
Translink provides public transit services to Maple Ridge, via buses and the West Coast Express. Haney Place Exchange is the main bus exchange, with every bus line in Maple Ridge stopping here at some point along its route.

Maple Ridge is connected via Highway 7 to Pitt Meadows in the west and Mission in the east, and also by the Dewdney Trunk Road, a more northerly route which crosses into Mission via the community of Stave Falls.

The Golden Ears Bridge connects Maple Ridge and Pitt Meadows to Langley.

The Pitt Meadows Regional Airport is the only Fraser Valley airport (other than water airports) located on the Fraser River's north side.

Education 
Public schools are administered by School District 42 Maple Ridge-Pitt Meadows. The school district serves residents of Maple Ridge and neighbouring Pitt Meadows, along with students transferred in from other British Columbia school districts. The district also accepts international students.

The school district operates eighteen elementary schools, five secondary schools, an adult learning centre, a community college, and several other educational facilities in Maple Ridge.

Several of the five public secondary schools have specialized in certain areas and/or started academy programs to attract more students.

Thomas Haney Secondary School operates on a self-directed learning system that is designed to allow students to plot their own paths toward fulfilling ministry learning outcomes. The school also operates an equestrian academy for all abilities as well as music, theatre and athletic programs.

Samuel Robertson Technical Secondary School, opened in 2005, was designed to allow students to experience various technologies as well as their traditional education. The school offers various trades programs in partnership with local trade schools and colleges.

Garibaldi Secondary School offers the International Baccalaureate program and DigiPen Technology Academy.

Westview Secondary School and Maple Ridge Secondary School are the other two public high schools in Maple Ridge.

Several of the elementary schools also offer non-traditional systems. These include Kanaka Creek Elementary, which operates a year-round schooling system, exchanging a long summer break for shorter breaks throughout the year; and Alouette Elementary School, which operates a cyberschool program, enabling some students to work from home on a computer on certain days.

Several private schools are located in Maple Ridge. These include: Meadowridge School, a JK-12 independent non-denominational school; James Cameron School, a school for children in Grades 2–7 with learning disabilities; St. Patrick's, a Catholic school, and Maple Ridge Christian School which is K-12. These are not operated by the school district, but must still meet the British Columbia Ministry of Education standards.

Post-secondary education in Maple Ridge is available through:
BCIT, which offers courses as part of the BCIT School of Business Entrepreneurship Associate Certificate Program;
Douglas College, which has a campus in Thomas Haney Secondary School and also offers courses at the Ridge Meadows Maternity Clinic; and
Sprott Shaw College, which is a private post-secondary institution.

Notable people 
 Snak the Ripper, rapper
Elizabeth Bachinsky, poet
Linda Chung, Hong Kong actress and singer, was born in Maple Ridge.
Matthew Good, rock musician
Stirling Hart, World Champion Lumberjack, was born and raised in Maple Ridge.
Brad Hunt, NHL player for his hometown team the Vancouver Canucks
Susan Jacks, singer/songwriter
 Alexz Johnson, Music Artist/Vocalist, Actress in Instant Star, So Weird, Final Destination, Stranger with My Face
Tyler Labine, actor
Andrew Ladd, professional hockey player
Karina LeBlanc, professional soccer player for Team Canada
Madeline Merlo, country music singer/songwriter
Greg Moore, deceased Champ Car driver
Michael Moriarty, U.S.-Canadian stage and screen actor and jazz musician
George Mussallem, former Member of the Legislative Assembly (MLA) of British Columbia
Helen Mussallem, Companion of the Order of Canada recipient
Cam Neely, former professional hockey player
 Tyler O'Neill, Major League Baseball (MLB) player
Molly Parker, actress
El Phantasmo, professional wrestler
Gregory Scofield, poet
Jaswinder Kaur Sidhu, domestic murder victim, subject of documentaries and a made-for-television movie
Scott Smith, bassist for Loverboy
Rick Tippe, country music artist
Larry Walker, Hall of Fame Major League Baseball (MLB) player
Giuseppe du Toit, professional Rugby player
Linus Sebastian, Media Personality

Notes

References

External links 

 
Cities in British Columbia
Lower Mainland
Populated places in Greater Vancouver
Populated places on the Fraser River